Noel Purcell may refer to:

Noel Purcell (water polo and rugby union) (1899–1962), Irish sportsman
Noel Purcell (actor) (1900–1985), Irish film and television actor